Visa requirements for Malian citizens are administrative entry restrictions by the authorities of other states placed on citizens of the Mali. As of 2 July 2019, Malian citizens had visa-free or visa on arrival access to 54 countries and territories, ranking the Malian passport 90th in terms of travel freedom (tied with a passport from Niger) according to the Henley Passport Index.

Visa requirements map

Visa requirements

Dependent, Disputed, or Restricted territories
Unrecognized or partially recognized countries

Dependent and autonomous territories

See also

Visa policy of Mali
Malian passport

References and Notes
References

Notes

Mali
Foreign relations of Mali